Fang Xiongman (born 9 April 1993) is a former Chinese professional snooker player.

Career
Fang began competing at professional events in 2012, which included Asian Tour events as well as wildcard rounds of ranking tournaments. His most notable win as an amateur came at the 2015 Shanghai Masters, where he defeated Jamie Jones 5–1 in the wildcard round, but went on to get eliminated 5–2 by Stuart Bingham in the last 32.

In 2016, Fang managed to receive a two-year tour card for the 2016–17 and 2017–18 seasons after successfully qualifying through Q School, beating Daniel Womersley 4–3 in the final round of the event. The Riga Masters was the first ranking event of the year and he qualified for it by overcoming Stephen Maguire 4–2, before losing in the opening round 4–3 to Andy Hicks. Fang's first win of his career at the venue stage of a ranking was a 4–2 success over Martin O'Donnell at the Scottish Open. He exited the tournament 4–0 to Mark Allen in the second round.

He dropped off the tour at the end of the 2017/18 season and did not succeed to win back a place through Q School.

Performance and rankings timeline

References

External links

Fang Xiongman at worldsnooker.com
Fang Xiongman at CueTracker.net: Snooker Results and Statistic Database

1993 births
Place of birth missing (living people)
Living people
Chinese snooker players
21st-century Chinese people